Guardians of Middle-earth is a multiplayer online battle arena video game developed by Monolith Productions and published by Warner Bros. Interactive Entertainment. The setting of the game is Middle-earth, derived from The Lord of the Rings series, with various tie-ins to the film series of the same name, as well as The Hobbit film series. Guardians of Middle-earth was released for the PlayStation 3 and Xbox 360 consoles on December 4, 2012, via the PlayStation Network and Xbox Live Arcade respectively. A retail package is also released, which includes a download voucher for the game as well as a "Season Pass" for future downloadable content. It is no longer available on the PlayStation Network, and the game's servers are no longer operational.

The game was later released for Microsoft Windows on August 29, 2013.

Gameplay

Guardians of Middle-earth incorporates the standard elements of a typical multiplayer online battle arena (MOBA) game, with a strong emphasis upon team coordination. Up to ten players may split into two teams of five and from a pool of thirty-six guardians from The Lord of the Rings franchise, including Gandalf, Sauron and Radagast, and coordinate to win matches by destroying the opposing team's base. Unlike most other MOBA titles, Guardians of Middle-earth emphasizes home console, rather than desktop, gameplay, in order to gain a "cinematic" experience.

Reception

Guardians of Middle-earth received mixed reviews. It scored a 7.5/10 from IGN. Many users have problems with the games interfacing on PC, as well as numerous glitches in connectivity.

As of April 2019, Steam has removed Guardians of Middle Earth from their store page.

References

External links

2012 video games
Fantasy video games
Monolith Productions games
Multiplayer and single-player video games
Multiplayer online battle arena games
Multiplayer online games
PlayStation 3 games
PlayStation Network games
Video games scored by Inon Zur
Video games scored by Laura Karpman
Video games developed in the United States
Video games using Havok
Warner Bros. video games
Windows games
Xbox 360 games
Xbox 360 Live Arcade games
Middle-earth (film franchise) video games